The 2022–23 season is the 118th season in the history of 1. FSV Mainz 05 and their 14th consecutive season in the top flight. The club are participating in the Bundesliga and the DFB-Pokal.

Players

Transfers

In

Out

Pre-season and friendlies

Competitions

Overall record

Bundesliga

League table

Results summary

Results by round

Matches 
The league fixtures were announced on 17 June 2022.

DFB-Pokal

References

1. FSV Mainz 05 seasons
Mainz 05